Turbonilla gradata is a species of sea snail, a marine gastropod mollusk in the family Pyramidellidae, the pyrams and their allies.

Description
The shell grows to a length of 4.6 mm.

Distribution
This marine species occurs in the following locations:
 European waters (ERMS scope)
 Mediterranean Sea: Greece, Algeria
 Portuguese Exclusive Economic Zone
 Spanish Exclusive Economic Zone

References

External links
 To Biodiversity Heritage Library (8 publications)
 To CLEMAM
 To Encyclopedia of Life
 To World Register of Marine Species

gradata
Gastropods described in 1883